The 2013 Oklahoma Sooners softball team represented the University of Oklahoma in the 2013 NCAA Division I softball season.  The Sooners were coached by Patty Gasso, who led her nineteenth season.  The Sooners finished with a record of 57–4.  They played their home games at OU Softball Complex and competed in the Big 12 Conference, where they finished first with a 15–2 record.

The Sooners were invited to the 2013 NCAA Division I softball tournament, where they swept the Regionals and Super Regionals and then completed a run through the Women's College World Series to claim the NCAA Women's College World Series Championship.

Roster

Schedule

References

Oklahoma
Oklahoma Sooners softball seasons
Oklahoma Softball
Women's College World Series seasons
NCAA Division I softball tournament seasons
Big 12 Conference softball champion seasons